Norman Stephan Kinsella (born 1965) is an American intellectual property lawyer, author, and deontological  anarcho-capitalist. His legal works have been published by Oxford University Press, Oceana Publications, Mises Institute, Quid Pro Books and others.

Education
Born in Prairieville, Louisiana, he attended Louisiana State University where he earned Bachelor of Science (BS) and Master of Science (MS) degrees in electrical engineering, and a Juris Doctor (JD) from the Paul M. Hebert Law Center (formerly known as LSU Law Center). He also obtained an LL.M. at the University of London.

Career
Kinsella was general counsel of Applied Optoelectronics, Inc., of Sugar Land, Texas from 2000 to 2012 and is currently in private practice in Houston, Texas. He was formerly an adjunct scholar of the Ludwig von Mises Institute, a right-libertarian think-tank for the promotion of Rothbardian political thought and the Austrian School of economics, where he was Book Review Editor for the Journal of Libertarian Studies and a faculty member of the Mises Academy. Kinsella also founded the Center for the Study of Innovative Freedom (C4SIF) of which he currently is the Director. In May 2022 he was elected to the Libertarian Party Judicial Committee, but was subsequently disqualified due to being two months short of the 4 year Libertarian Party membership requirement to hold the office. As of August 2022, he is eligible and it's believed that he'll be appointed by the LP Judicial Committee to fill the vacancy caused by his ineligible run in May 2022.

Publications
Kinsella's legal publications include books and articles about patent law, contract law, e-commerce law, international law, and other topics.

Views
Kinsella is a strong opponent of intellectual property, arguing that patents and copyrights should not form part of a proper libertarian law code. He is a proponent of Hans-Hermann Hoppe's theory on argumentation ethics. He is an atheist, having previously been a devout Catholic.

Books
 International Investment, Political Risk, and Dispute Resolution: A Practitioner's Guide, Second Edition (Oxford University Press, 2020) (with Noah D. Rubins and Thomas N. Papanastasiou)
 Louisiana Civil Law Dictionary (Quid Pro Books, 2011) (with Gregory Rome)
 Law in a Libertarian World: Legal Foundations of a Free Society (Papinian Press, 2021)
 Protecting Foreign Investment Under International Law: Legal Aspects of Political Risk. Dobbs Ferry, N.Y.: Oceana Publications. 1997. . (with Paul E. Comeaux)
 Online Contract Formation. Dobbs Ferry, N.Y.: Oceana Publications. 2004. . . (with Andrew F. Simpson) 
 Against Intellectual Property. Ludwig von Mises Institute. 2008. .
  . (with Teresa C. Tucker, co-editor)

Articles
 Symposium: "Do patents and copyrights undermine private property?" by Ilana Mercer, Stephan Kinsella, and James DeLong (Insight on the News, 21 May 2001)
 Against Intellectual Property (Journal of Libertarian Studies, Spring 2001) [Volume 15, no. 2, p. 1–53]

References

External links
 KinsellaLaw, Kinsella's legal website
 StephanKinsella.com, Kinsella's libertarian website
 Archive of Kinsella commentary from LewRockwell.com

1965 births
Living people
American anarcho-capitalists
American atheists
American legal scholars
American libertarians
American male bloggers
American bloggers
Intellectual property activism
Libertarian theorists
Louisiana lawyers
Louisiana State University alumni
Mises Institute people
American patent attorneys
People from Prairieville, Louisiana
Philosophers of law
Texas lawyers